Mary Reynolds (10 October 1889 – 29 August 1974) was an Irish politician, farmer and grocer from County Leitrim.

She was first elected to Dáil Éireann as a Cumann na nGaedheal Teachta Dála (TD) at the 1932 general election for the Leitrim–Sligo constituency. Her husband Patrick Reynolds had been a TD for the same constituency in the 6th Dáil, but was fatally shot during the 1932 general election campaign. The election in Leitrim–Sligo was then postponed, and she won the seat, serving in the Dáil for 25 years.

She lost her seat at the 1933 general election but was elected for the Leitrim constituency at the 1937 general election as a Fine Gael TD. She represented the Sligo–Leitrim constituency from 1948 until her retirement at the 1961 general election.

She had seven children, including her son Patrick J. Reynolds, who was a Fine Gael TD and senator, as was his son Gerry Reynolds.

See also
Families in the Oireachtas

References

1889 births
1974 deaths
Cumann na nGaedheal TDs
Fine Gael TDs
Irish farmers
Members of the 7th Dáil
Members of the 9th Dáil
Members of the 10th Dáil
Members of the 11th Dáil
Members of the 12th Dáil
Members of the 13th Dáil
Members of the 14th Dáil
Members of the 15th Dáil
Members of the 16th Dáil
20th-century women Teachtaí Dála
Politicians from County Leitrim
Spouses of Irish politicians